The 1962–63 international cricket season was from September 1962 to April 1963.

Season overview

November

England in Australia

February

England in New Zealand

March

International Cavaliers in South Africa

References

International cricket competitions by season
1962 in cricket
1963 in cricket